The Avisio is an  Italian stream (a torrente), a left tributary of the Adige, whose course is in Trentino.

References

External links

Rivers of Trentino
Rivers of Italy